Dextra Quotskuyva Nampeyo (born September 7, 1928, Polacca, Arizona) is a Native American potter and artist. She is in the fifth generation of  a distinguished ancestral line of Hopi potters.

In 1994 Dextra Quotskuyva was proclaimed an “Arizona Living Treasure,” and in 1998 she received the first Arizona State Museum Lifetime Achievement Award. In 2001, the Wheelwright Museum organized a 30-year retrospective exhibition of Quotskuyva's pottery, and in 2004, she received the  Southwestern Association for Indian Arts Lifetime Achievement award.

Family 
She is the great-granddaughter of Hopi-Tewa potter Nampeyo of Hano, who revived Sikyátki style pottery, descending through her eldest daughter, Annie Healing. Dextra is the daughter of Rachel Namingha (1903–1985), and sister of Priscilla Namingha, who are other notable Hopi-Tewa potters. Her daughter, Hisi Nampeyo is also a potter, and her son, Dan Namingha, is painter and sculptor. Her husband, Edwin Quotskuyva, was a veteran and a Hopi tribal leader.

Work 
Dextra began her artistic career in 1967, following Nampeyo's rich heritage rooted in Sikyatki decorations. At first, following the advice of her mother to stay true to the old styles, Dextra's design repertoire was limited to traditional Nampeyo migration and bird designs. After her mother died in 1985, Dextra felt at greater liberty to express her personal creativity. She was the first Nampeyo potter to produce a commodity for public consumption.

Quotskuyva experiments with the traditional materials usually used for pottery, gathering clay from different sources from her reservation and creating variations on the characteristic orange, tan, and brown hues of Hopi bonfire pots. For the decorations, she uses bee-weed plant for the black and native clay slips for the red.

In describing her way of creating pottery, she said: "One day my pottery calls for me, and then I know this is the day I must do it".

Noted American Indian art dealer and collector, Martha Hopkins Lanman Struever, authored a book about Dextra entitled "Painted Perfection", exploring a collection of her works which were exhibited at the Wheelwright Museum of the American Indian.

See also

 Fannie Nampeyo, potter, daughter of Nampeyo
 Elva Nampeyo (1926–1985),  potter, Dextra's aunt.
 Dan Namingha, her son, artist and sculptor
 Martha Hopkins Struever, American Indian art dealer and Quotskuyva's biographer.

Selected public collections 
 Lowell D. Holmes Museum of Anthropology, Wichita State University
 Minneapolis Institute of Art
 Nelson Atkins Museum of Art
 National Museum of the American Indian
 Museum of Texas Tech University, Texas Tech University, Lubbock, TX.

References 

Pecina, Ron and Pecina, Bob. ‘’Hopi Kachinas: History, Legends, and Art’’. Schiffer Publishing Ltd., 2013. ; p. 161

Further reading
 Dillingham, Rick – Fourteen Families in Pueblo Pottery. 1994.
 Peterson, Susan – Pottery of American Indian Women: The Legacy of Generations. 1997.
 Schaaf, Gregory – Hopi-Tewa Pottery: 500 Artist Biographies. 1998.

External links 
 Dextra Quotskuyva biography at Holmes Museum of Anthropology. The best biography available online.
 Another capsule biography, by Martha Hopkins Struever.
 Dextra Quotskuyva pottery at Google Images

1928 births
Hopi people
Living people
Native American potters
Artists from Arizona
Native American women artists
Women potters
20th-century American artists
20th-century ceramists
20th-century American women artists
21st-century American artists
21st-century ceramists
21st-century American women artists
People from Navajo County, Arizona
American women ceramists
American ceramists
20th-century Native Americans
21st-century Native Americans
20th-century Native American women
21st-century Native American women
Native American people from Arizona